Book Review Index is an index of book reviews and literary criticism, found in leading academic, popular, and professional periodicals.  It has been published since 1965.  For most of its history it has been owned by Gale and is based in Detroit.

Publication history
Volume 1 of Book Review Index was published in 1965. It was originally published monthly. Starting in May 1977, the index was published bi-monthly.  In 1994, the index became quarterly. Since 1996, it has been published three times a year along with an annual accumulation.

In 1975, Gale began publishing Children's Book Review Index, which included information from Book Review Index on children's literature.

Online
The entire index of more than 5.6 million reviews covering over 2.5 million titles is also available as Book Review Index Online or Book Review Index Plus with the full electronic text of more than 600,000 discussions.

See also
List of academic databases and search engines
Academic Journal - Book reviews
Book reviews

References

Further reading

External links
 Book Review Index Online
 Cornell University on Book Reviews

Bibliographic databases and indexes
Bimonthly magazines published in the United States
Book review magazines
Cengage books
Magazines established in 1965
Magazines published in Detroit
Monthly magazines published in the United States
Quarterly magazines published in the United States
Triannual magazines published in the United States